Imaging phantom, or simply phantom, is a specially designed object that is scanned or imaged in the field of medical imaging to evaluate, analyze, and tune the performance of various imaging devices. A phantom is more readily available and provides more consistent results than the use of a living subject or cadaver, and likewise avoids subjecting a living subject to direct risk. Phantoms were originally employed for use in 2D x-ray based imaging techniques such as radiography or fluoroscopy, though more recently phantoms with desired imaging characteristics have been developed for 3D techniques such as SPECT, MRI, CT, Ultrasound, PET, and other imaging methods or modalities.

Design
A phantom used to evaluate an imaging device should respond in a similar manner to how human tissues and organs would act in that specific imaging modality. For instance, phantoms made for 2D radiography may hold various quantities of x-ray contrast agents with similar x-ray absorbing properties to normal tissue to tune the contrast of the imaging device or modulate the patients exposure to radiation. In such a case, the radiography phantom would not necessarily need to have similar textures and mechanical properties since these are not relevant in x-ray imaging modalities. However, in the case of ultrasonography, a phantom with similar rheological and ultrasound scattering properties to real tissue would be essential, but x-ray absorbing properties would not be needed.

The term "phantoms" describe an object that is designed to resemble human tissue and can be evaluated, analyzed or manipulated to study the performance of a medical device. 
Phantoms are creating using a digital file that is rendered through magnetic resonance imaging (MRI) or computer-aided design (CAD). The digital files allow for quick modifications that are read by the 3D printer.The 3D printer will create the product in successive layers using polymeric materials.

There are several types of phantoms including tissue-mimicking, radiological phantoms, dental phantoms, and more.

See also
 Computational human phantom
 Jaszczak phantom
 Phantom structure
 Shepp-Logan Phantom

References

Image processing
Medical imaging